Katlego Mohamme (born 10 March 1998) is a South African soccer player currently playing as a centre-back for University of Pretoria.

Career statistics

Club

Notes

International

References

1998 births
Living people
South African soccer players
South Africa international soccer players
South Africa under-20 international soccer players
South Africa youth international soccer players
Association football defenders
Campeonato de Portugal (league) players
National First Division players
SuperSport United F.C. players
Sertanense F.C. players
University of Pretoria F.C. players
Footballers at the 2020 Summer Olympics
Olympic soccer players of South Africa
People from the City of Tshwane Metropolitan Municipality